Trillium viride, commonly called the wood wakerobin, is a species of flowering plant in the family Melanthiaceae. It is found in the central United States, in certain parts of Missouri and Illinois. The specific epithet viride means "youthful" or "fresh-green", an apparent reference to the color of the plant's flower petals. For this reason, it is also called the green trillium, not to be confused with other green-flowered trilliums such as T. viridescens and the green form of T. sessile, both of which are found in Missouri.

Description

Trillium viride was first described by Lewis Caleb Beck in 1826. It is a perennial herb up to 35 cm tall. Flowers are sometimes entirely green, sometimes entirely purple, sometimes 2-tone with green and purple streaks or bands. The plant grows in richly wooded areas, often on steep hillsides.

Similar species

Since T. viride and T. viridescens are morphologically similar, they are often confused. The following table compares the two species character by character:

Most importantly, T. viride exhibits one unique feature among all trilliums: the entire upper surface of each leaf is covered with numerous stomata, seen to the naked eye as tiny white dots. In comparison, T. viridescens has at most a few stomata near the leaf tip only.

T. viride has numerous other look-alikes. Of particular importance is T. sessile, which may have yellow-green petals. The two are readily distinguished by examining their respective floral dimensions. The stamens of T. sessile are more than half the length of its petals whereas the stamens of T. viride are less than half the length of its petals.

Distribution

Trillium viride occurs within a relatively small region along the Missouri River in east-central Missouri, and along both sides of the Mississippi River in eastern Missouri and southwestern Illinois. It prefers rich woods, bluffs, and rocky hillsides.

T. viride is known to occur in the following counties in Missouri and Illinois:

 Missouri: Audrain, Barry, Benton, Bollinger, Boone, Butler, Callaway, Carter, Crawford, Franklin, Iron, Jefferson, Lincoln, Madison, Moniteau, Montgomery, Perry, Pike, Ralls, Saint Charles, Saint Francois, Saint Genevieve, Saint Louis, Saint Louis City, Taney, Warren, Washington, Wayne
 Illinois: Adams, Franklin, Jackson, Macoupin, Perry, Pike, Union, Williamson

In the above lists, boldface indicate those counties where both T. viride and T. viridescens are known to occur.

Bibliography

References

External links

 
 Trillium photo gallery, Dr. John D. Freeman's pictures
 
 
 

viride
Endemic flora of the United States
Flora of Illinois
Flora of Missouri
Plants described in 1826
Flora without expected TNC conservation status